Kjell Roos (born 11 March 1956), is a Swedish guitarist and singer.

Roos leads the Swedish dansband Kjell Roos Band, earlier known as Roosarna. He has done duets with Swedish singer Kikki Danielsson such as I juletid (Save Your Love), Kvällens sista dans and Har du glömt?. In 1994, Kikki Danielsson & Roosarna received a Grammis for "Dansband of the year" for the album Vet du vad jag vet.

References

External links
 Grammis awards of 1994.

1956 births
Living people
Swedish guitarists
Male guitarists
Dansband singers
Roosarna members
Swedish male musicians